Guy Nik (also Romanized as Gūy Nīk and Gūynak) is a village in Raz Rural District, Raz and Jargalan District, Bojnord County, North Khorasan Province, Iran. At the 2006 census, its population was 454, in 126 families.

References 

Populated places in Bojnord County